Pushpa Hans Kapoor (1917–2011) was an Indian playback singer and actor of the Hindi and Punjabi film industries in the 1940s and 1950s. She was known for her songs in the 1950 Hindi film, Sheesh Mahal and her acting in the 1949 film Apna Desh. She was a recipient of the fourth highest Indian civilian award of the Padma Shri.

Biography 
Hans was born on 30 November 1917 at Fazilka in Punjab of the British India to Ratan Lal Kapoor, a lawyer and Janak Rani Kapoor. Her schooling was at the local school in Fazilka, after which she studied classical music at Patwardhan Gharana of Lahore from where she graduated in music. She started her career at the Lahore station of the All India Radio and subsequently entered film industry as a playback singer. Later, she also acted in many Hindu films, notably in Apna Desh, a 1949 Hindi film directed by renowned filmmaker, V. Shantaram.

The Government of India awarded her the fourth highest civilian honor of the Padma Shri, in 2007, for her contributions to cinema. She received two more awards the same year, Punjabi Bhushan Award and Kalpana Chawla Excellence Award.

Pushpa Hans, who was married to Hans Raj Chopra, a colonel in the Indian Army, died on 9 December 2011.

Selected songs 
Punjabi Songs

 Chan kithan gujaari saari raat ve
 Sari raat tera takni ha raah tarean to puchh chann wey
 Gallan dilan diyaan dila vich reh gayiyaan by shiv kumar batalvi
 Channa meri bah chhad dey
 Chunni da palla
 Lutti heer wey faqir de

Hindi Songs

 Aadmi woh haay musibat se pareshan na ho
 Bedard zamaana kya jaane
 Bhoole zamaane yaad na kar yaad na kar
 Dil kisise lagaake dekh liya
 Dil-e-naadaan tujhe kya hua hai
 Koi ummeed bar nahin aati
 Meri khushiyon ke savere ki kabhi shaam na ho
 Taqdeer bananewaale ne kaisi taqdeer banaayi hai
 Tohe dil ki qasam tohe dil ki qasam
 Tu maane ya na maane
 Tum dekh rahe ho ki mite saare sahaare

Awards and recognition
 Padma Shri in 2007
 Punjabi Bhushan Award
 Kalpana Chawla Excellence Award

See also 
 Apna Desh (1949 film)
 Sheesh Mahal (1950 film)

References

External links 
 

Recipients of the Padma Shri in arts
1917 births
2011 deaths
People from Fazilka district
Punjabi-language singers
Indian women playback singers
Indian film actresses
20th-century Indian actresses
20th-century Indian singers
20th-century Indian women singers
Actresses from Punjab, India
Singers from Punjab, India
Women musicians from Punjab, India